Rajdhani College is a constituent college of the University of Delhi. It was established in 1964 by the Delhi Administration under the name of Government College. The college acquired its new name when the Delhi Administration vested its governance in an autonomous governing body. Rajdhani College is an South Campus College.

The college is situated on Mahatma Gandhi Marg (Ring Road), near Rajouri Garden and Raja Garden in west Delhi. Its new building was constructed around 1976–77. The college complex has all facilities such as seminar room, auditorium, library, laboratories, playgrounds for cricket, football, hockey, and volleyball etc. It is a co-educational institution.

Departments 
 Chemistry
Industrial Chemistry
 Commerce
 Computer Science
 Economics
 English
 Hindi
 History
 Life Science
 Linguistics
 Mathematics
 Physical Education
 Physics and Electronics
 Political Science
 Sanskrit

Courses Offered 
 B.Com. (Hons.)
 B.A. (Hons.) English
 B.A. (Hons.) Hindi
 B.A. (Hons.) Sanskrit
 B.A. (Hons.) History
 B.A. (Hons.) Political Science
 B.A. (Hons.) Economics
 BSc (Hons.) Chemistry
 BSc (APS) Industrial Chemistry
 BSc (Hons.) Physics
 BSc (Hons.) Mathematics
 BSc (Hons.) Electronics
 B.A. Program
 BSc Program in Physical Sciences
 BSc Program in Applied Physical Sciences

At Post Graduate level, Rajdhani College offers courses in English, Hindi, History and Commerce.

Notable people

Notable alumni
Kartik Thakur, Flying Officer, IAF
Ashish Nehra, Cricketer, National Cricket Team
Devendra Sharma, Cricket Umpire
Aakash Chopra, Cricketer – Duleep Trophy, Ranji Trophy, National Cricket Team.
Dibang, Anchor at NDTV, STAR News, ABP News
Balbir Punj, A Member of Parliament
Mala Ram Gangwal, Member of Legislative Assembly, Delhi

Notable faculty
Ram Babu Gupta, (Cricket Umpire – International)
Rama Kant Shukla, Sanskrit poet

See also 
 Education in Delhi
 List of colleges under Delhi University
 List of alumni of the University of Delhi
 Educational Institutions in Delhi
 Delhi University Community Radio
 DUSU

References

Universities and colleges in Delhi
1964 establishments in Delhi
Educational institutions established in 1964